Althea Garrison (born October 7, 1940) is an independent American politician from Boston, Massachusetts, who has served on the Boston City Council as an at-large councilor.

Garrison was elected as a Republican to the Massachusetts House of Representatives in 1992 and served one term from 1993 to 1995. Both before and after Garrison's successful bid for office, she has run unsuccessfully in multiple elections for the state legislature and Boston City Council, as a Republican, Democrat, or independent, which has resulted in her being described in the media as a "perennial candidate". Garrison is also known as the first transgender person to be elected to a state legislature in the United States. She was outed against her will by the Boston Herald after her election in 1992.

Garrison later served as an at-large member of the Boston City Council from January 2019 to January 2020 due to a vacancy left by Ayanna Pressley's election to the United States House of Representatives. Because Garrison was the next-place finisher in the 2017 Boston City Council election, she was eligible to take office per City Council rules. She was not re-elected in November 2019.

Background
Born in Hahira, Georgia, as the youngest of seven children, Garrison attended Hahira High School there. Garrison moved to Boston to attend beauty school, but went on to enroll in Newbury Junior College and received an associate degree there. Garrison later received a B.S. degree in administration from Suffolk University, an M.S. degree in management from Lesley College, and a certificate in special studies in administration and management from Harvard University.

According to records in the Suffolk County Probate Court, Garrison petitioned for a name change to Althea Garrison in 1976. The petition stated that the name Althea Garrison "is consistent with petitioner's appearance and medical condition and is the name by which he  will be known in the future." 

Besides her one term in the Massachusetts House, Garrison has worked as a clerk in human resources for the Massachusetts state comptroller's office, where she used her vacation time to run for office.  She served for four years on the Metropolitan Area Planning Council.

Political career

Early years
In 1982 and 1986, Garrison ran unsuccessfully for the Massachusetts House of Representatives as a Democrat. She ran unsuccessfully for Boston City Council in 1983, 1985, 1987, 1989, and 1991. During the 1991 campaign, the Boston Herald noted that she had run for office nine times, although Garrison herself later described the race as her 10th or 11th bid for office. In the 1991 race, Garrison finished in third place in the District 7 preliminary election.

Massachusetts House
In 1992, Garrison ran successfully for the 5th Suffolk district in the Massachusetts House, representing the Dorchester and Roxbury areas of Boston. Garrison's 1992 election to the legislature was made possible in part by the fact that she challenged some of the signatures that the then-incumbent representative, Nelson Merced, had submitted to qualify for the Democratic primary ballot. Her challenge was successful and meant that Garrison did not have to run against an incumbent in the general election. In the general election, Garrison defeated Democratic candidate Irene Roman, 2,451 votes to 2,014.

The fact that Garrison had been formerly known as a male was not widely publicized until shortly after she was elected to the legislature. When the Boston Herald asked whether she was a man, Garrison denied it and ended the conversation when asked about her past, including her name change.

In the Massachusetts House, Garrison consistently voted in favor of labor unions, resulting in her being endorsed for re-election by the Massachusetts AFL-CIO and eight unions. On many votes, she voted with the Democrats in the legislature rather than with the Republicans. However, she opposed same-sex marriage and abortion.

Garrison was defeated in her 1994 bid for re-election by Democratic candidate Charlotte Golar Richie by a margin of 2,108 votes to 1,718.

Unsuccessful bids for office
Garrison ran for office at least 32 times, all but one unsuccessfully, including:
 1982: 5th Suffolk district in the Massachusetts House as a Democratic candidate, finished third in the primary.
 1985: at-large seat in the 1985 Boston City Council election
 1986: 5th Suffolk district in the Massachusetts House as an Democratic candidate, finished third in the primary.
 1987: at-large seat in the 1987 Boston City Council election
 1988: 5th Suffolk district in the Massachusetts House as an independent candidate, losing 63.6% to 35.7% to Nelson Merced.
 1989: at-large seat in the 1989 Boston City Council election
 1990: 5th Suffolk district in the Massachusetts House as a Republican candidate, losing 55.3% to 31.2% to Nelson Merced.
 1991: District 7 seat in the 1991 Boston City Council election
 1995: District 7 seat in the 1995 Boston City Council election
 1996: special election in the 1st Suffolk district in the Massachusetts Senate as a Republican candidate, losing 50.1% to 48.7% to Dick Czubinski in the primary.
 1998: 5th Suffolk district in the Massachusetts House as a Republican candidate, losing 54.9% to 45.1% to Charlotte Golar Richie.
 1997: District 7 seat in the 1997 Boston City Council election
 1998: 5th Suffolk district in the Massachusetts House as a Democratic candidate, losing 58.5% to 41.5% to Charlotte Golar Richie in the primary.
 1999: District 7 seat in the 1999 Boston City Council election
 1999: special election in the 5th Suffolk district in the Massachusetts House as a Democratic candidate, finishing third in the primary.
 2000: 5th Suffolk district in the Massachusetts House as an "Independent Progressive" candidate
 2001: 2001 Boston mayoral election
 2002: special election for the 1st Suffolk district in the Massachusetts Senate as a Republican
 2002: 1st Suffolk district in the Massachusetts Senate as a Republican candidate, losing in the primary 68.9% to 31.0% to Walter R. Campbell.
 2003: at-large seat in the 2003 Boston City Council election
 2005: at-large seat in the 2005 Boston City Council election
 2006: 5th Suffolk district in Massachusetts House as a Republican candidate
 2008: 1st Suffolk district in the Massachusetts Senate as an independent candidate, losing 79.0% to 25.0% to Jack Hart.
 2009: District 7 seat in the 2009 Boston City Council election
 2010: 5th Suffolk district in the Massachusetts House, finishing third in the Democratic primary
 2011: special election to fill a vacancy on the Boston City Council, District 7, eliminated in February preliminary election
 2011: District 7 seat in the 2011 Boston City Council election
 2012: 5th Suffolk district in the Massachusetts House as an independent candidate, losing 77.6% to 21.7% to Carlos Henriquez.
 2013: at-large seat in the 2013 Boston City Council election
 2014: 5th Suffolk district in the Massachusetts House as a Democratic candidate, losing in the primary 65.3% to 34.3% to Evandro Carvalho.
 2015: District 7 seat in the 2015 Boston City Council election
 2016: 5th Suffolk district in the Massachusetts House as an independent candidate, losing 83.9% to 15.6% to Evandro Carvalho.
 2017: at-large seat in the 2017 Boston City Council election (fifth place, top four elected)
 2018: 5th Suffolk district in the Massachusetts House as an independent candidate, losing 88.7% to 11% to Liz Miranda.
 2019: at-large seat in the 2019 Boston City Council election (seventh place, top four elected)
 2020: Register of Probate for Suffolk County, Massachusetts (third place)

Boston City Council
Garrison took the at-large seat of former councillor Ayanna Pressley on the Boston City Council, as Pressley left the City Council following her November 2018 election to Congress from Massachusetts's 7th congressional district. City rules require that vacancies for the at-large council seats are filled by the next-placed candidate in the previous election, which was Garrison in November 2017. Garrison was sworn in on January 9, 2019. Garrison claimed that she, despite ideological differences, supported Pressley's election to the House of Representatives with the knowledge that she would have the opportunity to be Pressley's City Council successor by virtue of her own finish in the previous city council election.

Garrison was noted as a strong supporter of then-president Donald Trump, and an ardent backer of the Boston Police Department. She was also noted as the only strong conservative on the Boston City Council. Garrison described herself as an "independent conservative". She once explained, "I'm basically a conservative, but I also have some liberal ideas," and also explained, "I am a conservative, I am independent also," calling herself "a Black conservative."

As a city councilor, Garrison fiercely supported reviving rent control in the city. In April 2019, she introduced a home rule petition for the city to seek state permission to reinstate rent control in the city. The petition was heavily criticized by many fellow city council members. Garrison was supportive of the controversial "Operation Clean Sweep" effort by the police in August 2019, which saw 34 arrests in a two-day period in the so-called "Methadone Mile". Garrison proposed a pro-police resolution in the aftermath of Super Happy Fun America's 2019 "Straight Pride Parade" and unrest related to it.

Garrison was a candidate for re-election in the November 2019 election, but finished seventh in the general election field of eight candidates.

Personal life
Garrison identifies as a woman. In general, Garrison usually does not publicly discuss the topic of being a transgender individual.

Electoral history

Massachusetts House

Massachusetts Senate

Boston mayor

Boston City Council

 write-in votes

 write-in votes

 write-in votes

 write-in votes

Suffolk County Register of Probate

Republican State Committee Woman

See also
 Stacie Laughton, first out transgender person to be elected to state legislature (but resigned before being sworn in)
 Danica Roem, first out transgender person to be elected and serve in a state legislature

References

Further reading
 
 

1940 births
Politicians from Boston
African-American state legislators in Massachusetts
African-American women in politics
Harvard University alumni
Living people
Massachusetts Democrats
Massachusetts Republicans
Candidates in the 2021 United States elections
Members of the Massachusetts House of Representatives
People from Hahira, Georgia
Suffolk University alumni
Women state legislators in Massachusetts
LGBT state legislators in Massachusetts
LGBT people from Georgia (U.S. state)
Transgender politicians
Transgender women
Lesley University alumni
Newbury College (United States) alumni
Boston City Council members
American LGBT city council members
Women city councillors in Massachusetts
African-American city council members in Massachusetts
LGBT African Americans
21st-century African-American politicians
21st-century American politicians
21st-century African-American women
20th-century African-American people
21st-century LGBT people
20th-century African-American women
21st-century American women politicians